Yin Dehang (born 8 January 2001) is a Chinese artistic gymnast. He won three medals at the 2018 Summer Youth Olympics held in Buenos Aires, Argentina. In the pommel horse event he won the gold medal and in the parallel bars event he won the silver medal. He also won the bronze medal in the rings. In the floor exercise he did not qualify to compete in the final.

In 2019, he won the silver medal in the men's team event at the Chinese Artistic Gymnastics Championships held in Zhaoqing, Guangdong. In 2020, he won the gold medal in the men's team event at the Chinese Artistic Gymnastics Championships, also held in Zhaoqing, Guangdong.

References

External links 

 

Living people
2001 births
Place of birth missing (living people)
Chinese male artistic gymnasts
Gymnasts at the 2018 Summer Youth Olympics
Youth Olympic gold medalists for China
21st-century Chinese people